70th ACE Eddie Awards
January 17, 2020

Feature Film (Dramatic): 
Parasite

Feature Film (Comedy or Musical): 
Jojo Rabbit

The 70th American Cinema Editors Eddie Awards was presented on January 17, 2020, at the Beverly Hilton Hotel, honoring the best editors in films and television. The nominees were announced on December 11, 2019.

Winners and nominees
Winners will be listed first, highlighted in boldface

Film
Best Edited Feature Film – Dramatic
 Yang Jin-mo – Parasite
 Michael McCusker and Andrew Buckland – Ford v Ferrari
 Thelma Schoonmaker – The Irishman
 Jeff Groth – Joker
 Jennifer Lame – Marriage Story

Best Edited Feature Film – Comedy or Musical
 Tom Eagles – Jojo Rabbit
 Billy Fox – Dolemite Is My Name
 Michael Taylor and Matthew Friedman – The Farewell
 Bob Ducsay – Knives Out
 Fred Raskin – Once Upon a Time in Hollywood

Best Edited Animated Feature Film
 Axel Geddes – Toy Story 4
 Jeff Draheim – Frozen II
 Benjamin Massoubre – I Lost My Body

Best Edited Documentary (Feature)
 Todd Douglas Miller – Apollo 11
 Lindsay Utz – American Factory
 Jake Pushinsky and Heidi Scharfe – Linda Ronstadt: The Sound of My Voice
 David J. Turner and Thomas G. Miller – Making Waves: The Art of Cinematic Sound

Best Edited Documentary (Non-Theatrical)
 Jake Pushinsky – What's My Name: Muhammad Ali
 James Cude – Abducted in Plain Sight
 Dava Whisenant – Bathtubs Over Broadway
 Jules Cornell – Leaving Neverland

Television
Best Edited Comedy Series for Commercial Television
 Janet Weinberg – Better Things (Episode: "Easter")
 Nena Erb – Crazy Ex-Girlfriend (Episode: "I Need to Find My Frenemy")
 Eric Kissack – The Good Place (Episode: "Pandemonium")
 Trevor Ambrose – Schitt's Creek (Episode: "Life is a Cabaret")

Best Edited Comedy Series for Non-Commercial Television
 Gary Dollner – Fleabag (Episode: "2.1.")
 Kyle Reiter – Barry (Episode: "berkman > block")
 Liza Cardinale – Dead to Me (Episode: "Pilot")
 Todd Downing – Russian Doll (Episode: "The Way Out")

Best Edited Drama Series for Commercial Television
 Dan Crinnion – Killing Eve (Episode: "Desperate Times")
 David J. Siegel – Chicago Med (Episode: "Never Going Back to Normal")
 Al Morrow – Killing Eve (Episode: "Smell Ya Later")
 Rosanne Tan – Mr. Robot (Episode: "401 Unauthorized")

Best Edited Drama Series for Non-Commercial Television
 Tim Porter – Game of Thrones (Episode: "The Long Night")
 Julio C. Perez IV – Euphoria (Episode: "Pilot")
 Kirk Baxter – Mindhunter (Episode: "Episode 2")
 David Eisenberg – Watchmen (Episode: "It's Summer and We're Running Out of Ice")

Best Edited Miniseries or Motion Picture for Television
 Jinx Godfrey and Simon Smith – Chernobyl (Episode: "Vichnaya Pamyat")
 Tim Streeto – Fosse/Verdon (Episode: "Life is a Cabaret")
 Terilyn A. Shropshire – When They See Us (Episode: "Part 1")

Best Edited Non-Scripted Series
 Cameron Dennis, Kelly Kendrick, Joe Matoske, and Ryo Ikegami – VICE Investigates (Episode: "Amazon on Fire")
 Ben Bulatao, Rob Butler, Isaiah Camp, Greg Cornejo, and Joe Mikan – Deadliest Catch (Episode: "Triple Jeopardy")
 Stephanie Neroes, Sam Citron, LaRonda Morris, Rachel Cushing, Justin Goll, Masayoshi Matsuda, and Kyle Schadt – Surviving R. Kelly (Episode: "All the Missing Girls")

References

External links

70
2019 film awards
2019 in American cinema